Soininen is a Finnish surname. Notable people with the surname include:

 Mikael Soininen (1860–1924), Finnish educationist and politician
 Lauri Soininen (1875–1919), Finnish poet and journalist
 Heikki Soininen (1891–1957), Finnish farmer and politician
 Jani Soininen (born 1972), Finnish ski jumper

Finnish-language surnames